Sugar Creek Township is one of fifteen townships in Clinton County, Illinois, USA.  As of the 2010 census, its population was 6,184 and it contained 2,506 housing units.  The township's name changed from Trenton Township on June 1, 1874.

Geography

Cities, towns, villages
 Aviston (vast majority)
 Trenton

Cemeteries
The township contains these three cemeteries: Saint Francis, Saint Marys and Trenton.

Major highways
  US Route 50
  Illinois Route 160

Lakes
 Sportsman Lake

Landmarks
 Cemetery

Demographics

School districts
 Aviston School District 21 
 Wesclin Community Unit School District 3

Political districts
 Illinois' 19th congressional district
 State House District 102
 State Senate District 51

References
 
 United States Census Bureau 2007 TIGER/Line Shapefiles
 United States National Atlas

External links
 City-Data.com
 Illinois State Archives

Townships in Clinton County, Illinois
Townships in Illinois